Sambra  is a suburb in Belgaum city in the state of Karnataka, India. It is located in Belgaum taluk of Belgaum district in Karnataka. It houses the Belgaum Airport which is a domestic airport serving the city of Belgaum .

Demographics
 India census, Sambra had a population of 10755 with 6188 males and 4567 females.

Indian Air Force Station
Indian Air Force has an Airmen Training Centre (non-flying station) at Sambra or Sambre, Belgaum.

Education
Sambra has a Kendriya Vidyalaya (central school) to provide education to the air force personnel's children.

See also
 Belgaum
 Districts of Karnataka

References

External links
 http://Belgaum.nic.in/

Villages in Belagavi district